Mihály Szever Vanecsai, also known in Slovenian as Miháo Sever Vaneča or Miháo Sever z Vaneča (ca. 1699–1750) was a Hungarian Slovenian Lutheran priest, born in the village of Vanecsa (Vaslak or Vaneča) in the Prekmurje region. He died in Nemescsó.

In 1742 he wrote the book Réd zvelicsánsztva (Expectant Salvation), published in Germany in Halle on the Saale.

See also 
 List of Slovene writers and poets in Hungary

References
 Anton Trstenjak: Slovencia na Ogrskem (Hungarian Slovenes), Maribor 2006. 

Slovenian writers and poets in Hungary
Slovenian Lutheran clergy
Hungarian writers
17th-century births
1750 deaths
Year of birth uncertain
Year of death uncertain
People from the Municipality of Puconci